Lewis Menary (8 October 1882 – 24 April 1956) was a Progressive Conservative party member of the House of Commons of Canada. He was born in Amaranth Township, Ontario and became a farmer and merchant by career. Menary served as reeve of Grand Valley in 1910 and 1911.

He was first elected to Parliament at the Wellington North riding in the 1945 general election after an unsuccessful attempt there in the 1940 election. Menary was defeated in the 1949 election by Arnold Darroch of the Liberal party.

References

External links
 

1882 births
1956 deaths
Canadian farmers
Canadian merchants
Members of the House of Commons of Canada from Ontario
Mayors of places in Ontario
People from Dufferin County
Progressive Conservative Party of Canada MPs